uname (short for unix name) is a computer program in Unix and Unix-like computer operating systems that prints the name, version and other details about the current machine and the operating system running on it.

History
The uname system call and command appeared for the first time in PWB/UNIX. Both are specified by POSIX. The GNU version of uname is included in the "sh-utils" or "coreutils" packages. uname itself is not available as a standalone program. The version of uname bundled in GNU coreutils was written by David MacKenzie. The command is available as a separate package for Microsoft Windows as part of the GnuWin32 project and the UnxUtils collection of native Win32 ports of common GNU Unix-like utilities.

Related and similar commands
 Some Unix variants, such as AT&T UNIX System V Release 3.0, include the related setname program, used to change the values that uname reports.

 The ver command found in operating systems such as DOS, OS/2 and Microsoft Windows is similar to the uname command.

 The bash shell provides the special variables OSTYPE and HOSTTYPE whose values are similar to those of uname -o and uname -m respectively.

Examples
On a system running Darwin, the output from running uname with the -a command line argument might look like the text below:
$ uname -a
Darwin Roadrunner.local 10.3.0 Darwin Kernel Version 10.3.0: Fri Feb 26 11:58:09 PST 2010; root:xnu-1504.3.12~1/RELEASE_I386 i386

The following table contains examples from various versions of uname on various platforms.

See also
 List of Unix commands
 lsb_release
 ver (command)

Footnotes

External links

Unix SUS2008 utilities
IBM i Qshell commands